A special election was held in  on October 20, 1828 to fill a vacancy left by the resignation of William Haile (J) on September 12, 1828

Election results

Hinds took his seat December 8, 1828.  Hinds had earlier won the general election to the 21st Congress.

See also
List of special elections to the United States House of Representatives
List of United States representatives from Mississippi
 1828 United States House of Representatives elections

References

Mississippi 1828 at-large
Mississippi 1828 at-large
1828 at-large
Mississippi at-large
United States House of Representatives at-large
United States House of Representatives 1828 at-large